Air shower can refer to the following terms:
Air shower (physics), the shower of particles produced when a high energy cosmic ray hits an atom high in the atmosphere
Air shower (room), a specialized antechamber of a cleanroom